The Stöbber (also: Stobber) is the central river in the hilly landscape of „Märkische Schweiz“ and the Märkische Schweiz Nature Park, Brandenburg, Germany. Near Neuhardenberg the Stöbber flows into the Alte Oder, whose waters run over some canals to the Oder River and the Baltic Sea. On a roughly  route of its course there is designated the nature protection area „Naturschutzgebiet Stobbertal“. In Altfriedland the river passes the Damm-Mühle (water mill) and, directly alongside the Kietzer See (lake), a Special European Protection Area (SPA) for the conservation of wild living birds (Birds Directive).

See also
List of rivers of Brandenburg
'

References

External links

Rivers of Brandenburg
Rivers of Germany